Dionini Ramon "Johnny" Guzmán Estrella (born January 21, 1971) is a Dominican former Major League Baseball pitcher. He played for the Oakland Athletics during the 1991 and 1992 seasons. He appeared in seven games, all as a relief pitcher.

References

1971 births
Arizona League Athletics players
Dominican Republic expatriate baseball players in the United States
Huntsville Stars players

Living people
Madison Muskies players
Major League Baseball pitchers
Major League Baseball players from the Dominican Republic
Modesto A's players
Oakland Athletics players
Southern Oregon A's players
Tacoma Tigers players
Dominican Republic expatriate baseball players in Taiwan
Wei Chuan Dragons players